Roberta Sinatra is an Italian scientist and associate professor at the IT University of Copenhagen. She is known for her work in network science and conducts research on quantifying success in science.

Early life and education 
Sinatra received her undergraduate degree from the University of Catania in 2005. She received her M.Sc. in theoretical physics from the same university in 2007 and, in 2008, an M.Sc. (Eccellenza Specialistica) from the Scuola superiore di Catania. She went on to earn a Ph.D in physics from the University of Catania in 2012, working with Vito Latora and Jesús Gómez-Gardeñes. She then held postdoctoral and associate research scientist positions  at Northeastern University and Dana Farber Cancer Institute. She joined  IT University of Copenhagen in 2019.

Research and career 
Sinatra is known for her research on the social determinants of success, using large-scale data sets and methods from statistical physics, machine learning and network science. Her early work was on cooperation in games. She has subsequently quantified performance and success in scientific and creative careers, as well as in art and culture. Through her research, she addressed gender inequality in academic publishing and the importance of luck in success.

Selected publications

Awards and honors 
In 2017 she was named a fellow of the Institute for Scientific Interchange. In 2020 Sinatra received a Junior Scientific Award from the Complex System Society, for "pioneer contributions to the science of science and success, having had an impact in multiple fields, from network science to computational social science and scientometrics".

References

External links 
 
 , December 13, 2021

Living people
University of Catania alumni
Academic staff of the IT University of Copenhagen
Women computer scientists
Data scientists
Italian scientists
Year of birth missing (living people)